was the fourth station on the Ōsaka Kaidō (or fifty-seventh of the fifty-seven stations of the Tōkaidō). It is located in the present-day city of Moriguchi, Osaka Prefecture, Japan. It spread through the modern Honmachi, Tatsuda-dōri and Hama-machi.

History
Moriguchi was always an important traveling center, but it was not until 1616, that it was officially established as a post town. According to a guide published in the latter part of the Edo period, it had one honjin, in addition to 27 other inns.

Originally, there was not any ferry service along the Yodo River, which ran along the path, but development of the ferry service further helped the post town flourish.

Today, there are some remains of the former post town. They can be found on the left bank of the Yodo River.

Neighboring post towns
Ōsaka Kaidō (extended Tōkaidō)
Hirakata-juku – Moriguchi-juku – Kōraibashi (ending location)

References

Stations of the Tōkaidō
History of Osaka Prefecture
Geography of Osaka Prefecture